Kudardup is a locality in the South West region of Western Australia.

In 1883, M. C. Davies set up a timber mill here, Koodardup Mill, to exploit the nearby karri forest; it was moved to Karridale a year later. The name was also recorded for the nearby Coodardup Caves around this time. In 1921 became the area and the area soon became part of the Group Settlement Scheme; part of the Group Settlement Scheme; In 1925  a stopping place on the Flinders Bay Branch Railway was established here its spelling was changed to "Kudardup" in 1926. In the 1940s and 1950s it was part of the War Service Land Settlement Scheme as well as successfully run dairies. It was officially gazetted a townsite in 1957.

In March 1961 Kudardup was devastated by bushfires.

At the 2016 census, Kudardup and the surrounding area had a population of 241.

References

Towns in Western Australia
South West (Western Australia)